Eyers Grove is a census-designated place in Columbia County, Pennsylvania, United States. It is part of Northeastern Pennsylvania. The population was 102 at the 2020 census. It is part of the Bloomsburg-Berwick micropolitan area.

Geography
Eyers Grove is located in northwestern Columbia County in the southwestern corner of Greenwood Township.

It is along Little Fishing Creek and is served by Pennsylvania Route 42, which leads north  to Millville and south  to Bloomsburg, the county seat. The northern three-quarters of Eyers Grove is mostly farmland.

Demographics

At the 2000 census, there were 86 people, 32 households and 24 families residing in the CDP. The population density was 400.1 per square mile (158.1/km2). There were 34 housing units at an average density of 158.2/sq mi (62.5/km2). The racial makeup of the CDP was 100.00% White.

There were 32 households, of which 25.0% had children under the age of 18 living with them, 65.6% were married couples living together, 3.1% had a female householder with no husband present, and 21.9% were non-families. 21.9% of all households were made up of individuals, and 12.5% had someone living alone who was 65 years of age or older. The average household size was 2.69 and the average family size was 3.16.

15.1% of the population were  under the age of 18, 11.6% from 18 to 24, 33.7% from 25 to 44, 23.3% from 45 to 64, and 16.3% who were 65 years of age or older. The median age was 41 years. For every 100 females, there were 100.0 males. For every 100 females age 18 and over, there were 108.6 males.

The median household income was $38,125 and the median family income was $41,875. Males had a median income of $29,375 vand females $16,875. The per capita income was $13,906. There were 11.1% of families and 9.5% of the population living below the poverty line, including no under eighteens and 33.3% of those over 64.

References

Bloomsburg–Berwick metropolitan area
Census-designated places in Columbia County, Pennsylvania
Census-designated places in Pennsylvania